Hubert Bernards was a Democratic representative in the Oregon Legislative Assembly, first elected in 1900 to represent Washington County. He served until at least 1911. A native of the Netherlands, he moved to Wisconsin at age 17 and to Washington County in 1875. He died in 1923.

References 

Year of birth missing
Oregon Democrats
20th-century American politicians
American people of Dutch descent
American politicians of Dutch descent
Dutch emigrants to the United States
1923 deaths
People from Wisconsin